Edward Kobie Stokes (born September 3, 1971) is an American former professional basketball player, who played at the center position.

College career
Stokes attended the University of Arizona, where he played college basketball with the Arizona Wildcats, from 1989 to 1993. During his collegiate career, he scored 984 points, grabbed 644 rebounds, and blocked 167 shots.

Professional career
Stokes was selected by the Miami Heat, in the second round of the 1993 NBA draft, with the 35th overall pick.Stokes started his professional career in the Greek Basket League, playing with Panionios. During his pro career, Stokes went on to represent the following clubs: Stefanel Milano, Aris Thessaloniki, Titanes de Morovis, Telemarket Roma, the Toronto Raptors, Olimpia Basket Pistoia, Keravnos, FC Porto, Libertad de Sunchales, STB Le Havre, and Crabs Rimini.

In the NBA, the player rights to Stokes and Jeff Webster, were traded by the Miami Heat, to the Washington Bullets, in 1995, in exchange for Rex Chapman and Terrence Rencher. However, Stokes was released without appearing for the team in any regular season games. Stokes was also under preseason contracts with the Denver Nuggets, in October 1996, and with the Seattle SuperSonics (October 1997 and September–October 2000). He appeared sparingly for the Toronto Raptors in the 1997–98 season, in which he averaged 0.8 points and 1.0 rebounds, in 4.3 minutes per game, in 4 games played.

References

External links
 College & NBA stats at databasebasketball.com

1971 births
Living people
African-American basketball players
American expatriate basketball people in Argentina
American expatriate basketball people in Canada
American expatriate basketball people in Cyprus
American expatriate basketball people in France
American expatriate basketball people in Greece
American expatriate basketball people in Italy
American expatriate basketball people in Portugal
American men's basketball players
Aris B.C. players
Arizona Wildcats men's basketball players
Basketball players from Syracuse, New York
Basket Rimini Crabs players
Centers (basketball)
FC Porto basketball players
Greek Basket League players
Keravnos B.C. players
Libertad de Sunchales basketball players
Miami Heat draft picks
Olimpia Basket Pistoia players
Olimpia Milano players
Pallacanestro Virtus Roma players
Panionios B.C. players
STB Le Havre players
Toronto Raptors players
21st-century African-American sportspeople
20th-century African-American sportspeople
Titanes de Morovis players